The  Indian Corporate Law Service (Hindi: भारतीय कॉरपोरेट विधि सेवा) abbreviated as ICLS, is one of the Central Civil Services (Group A) and it functions under the Ministry of Corporate Affairs, Government of India. The service is entrusted with the responsibility of the implementation of Companies Act,1956, Companies Act, 2013 and The Limited liability Partnership Act, 2008.

History
Created in the year 1967 as a service to administer the Companies Act, 1956 as the Company Law Service, it was renamed as Indian Company Law Service in the year 2002. The service functioned under Ministry of Finance (Department of Company Affairs) till 2004, after which an independent ministry by the name Ministry of Corporate Affairs was created to administer the Corporate Sector in India. The service was renamed as Indian Corporate Law Service in 2008 and was brought into the fold of Civil Services Examination. The first batch of Officers recruited through Civil Services Examination were inducted in the year 2009.The decision to bring the service ICLS into the fold of civil services was instrumental for regulating the complex corporate landscape which is getting evolved day by day.
Since 2016, Director General of Corporate Affairs (DGCoA) is the top most bureaucrat from ICLS who is equivalent to the post of Secretary to the Union of India.

Recruitment and training 
There are two streams of recruitment to the Indian Corporate Law Service - Direct Recruits and Promoted Officers. Since 2009, direct recruitment to Indian Corporate Law Service (ICLS) is through Civil Services Examination conducted by UPSC. Members belonging to Group B Service employed with the Ministry are gradually promoted over several years of service. The current ratio of two streams is kept at 3:2.The ICLS Academy, located at Manesar, Haryana Campus of the Indian Institute of Corporate Affairs (IICA), provide training to Probationary Officers (POs) in subjects like Finance, Accounting, Management, Economics and Law. In addition to the classroom training the POs are also provided hands on training in various offices across India.

Hierarchical Designations
The designations and time-scales within the Indian Corporate Law Service are as follows after cadre restructure:

1. Junior Time Scale-Level-10

Entry level (Probationer) 
   
Registrar of Companies In-charge

Assistant Registrar of Companies

Assistant Official Liquidator

Assistant Director, MCA HQs 

Senior Assistant Director, Serious Fraud Investigation office (SFIO)

Assistant General Manager, IEPF Authority

2. Senior Time Scale-Level-11

Registrar of Companies

Official Liquidator

Deputy Registrar of Companies

Deputy Official Liquidator

Deputy Director, MCA HQs

Deputy Director, Serious Fraud Investigation office (SFIO)

Deputy Director, Indian Corporate Law Service Academy, Indian Institute of Corporate Affairs, Manesar 

Deputy General Manager, IEPF Authority

3. Junior Administrative Grade- Level-12 

Registrar of Companies

Official Liquidator

Joint Director

Secretary, Company Law Board

Joint Director/ Additional Director, Serious Fraud Investigation office (SFIO)

Additional General Manager/ General Manager, IEPF Authority

CAO, Indian Institute of Corporate Affairs, Manesar 

Deputy Secretary to the Government of India on Deputation through Central Staffing Scheme (CSS for AIS & Organised Group A central Services)

4. Selection Grade (Non Functional)- Level-13

Non Functional Upgradation,-{l) Whenever an Indian Administrative Services Officer of the state or Joint Cadre is posted at the Centre to a particular grade carrying a specific grade pay in Pay Band 3 or Pay Band 4 or Higher Administrative Grade, the officers belonging to the batch of Indian Corporate Law service who are senior by two years or more and have not so far been promoted to that particular grade shall be granted the same grade on non-functional basis from the date of posting of the Indian Administrative Services OIficer (IAS) in that particular grade at the Centre on the recommendation of the Departmental Screening Committee constituted in accordance with Service rules.

Director to the Government of India on deputation through Central Staffing Scheme (CSS for AIS & organised Group A Central Services) 

5. Senior Administrative Grade- Level-14

Regional Director

Director of Inspection and Investigation

Director of Prosecution

Joint Secretary to the Government of India on Deputation through Central Staffing Scheme (CSS for AIS & Organised Group A central Services) 

Member, NCLT & NCLAT
 

6. Higher Administrative Grade- Level-15

Director General of Corporate Affairs

Additional Secretary to the Government of India on deputation through Central Staffing Scheme (CSS for AIS & Organised Group A central Service)

Technical members in Tribunals like DRT, NCLT & NCLAT etc

Member in Insolvency & Bankruptcy Board under IBC

Work Profile

Role and functions of all the above-mentioned posts are either defined in the Companies Act, 2013 or defined in rules made by the Central Government in exercise of the powers delegated to it through the act. For instance posts like Registrar of Companies or the Official Liquidator are a statutory posts, but posts like the Regional Director or Director General of Inspection and Investigation are posts created by the Central Government in exercise of its powers. Apart from the traditional roles, ICLS officers in the capacity as ROCs in their respective jurisdiction are members of State Level Coordination Committees, Regional Economic Intelligence Committees, Market Intelligence Groups and several other groups sharing Economic Intelligence data with Income Tax and CBIC as well as with State Government Intelligence agencies. 
A brief description is provided below:

Registrar of Companies (RoC)

Registrars of Companies have jurisdiction over the various States and Union Territories are vested with the primary duty of registering Companies and Limited Liability Partnership (LLP) floated in the respective states and the Union Territories and ensuring that such companies and LLPs comply with statutory requirements under the Act, for instance periodic filing of Annual Returns and Balance Sheets, Change of directorship of the company etc. The Ministry exercises administrative control over these offices through the respective Regional Directors. Corporates functioning in India will have to abide by all statutory requirements and it is the duty cast on the office of the Registrar of Companies to ensure that all norms are followed and that any violations are brought to books. The RoC has the power to take action against companies that fail to submit requisite documents in time or for production of incorrect/incomplete information. The registered documents are made available to the Shareholders, Investors and the General public at large through an online portal MCA21 at a payment of nominal fee. The RoC also has suo-moto powers to order for inspection of companies and if deemed necessary, investigation can also be carried out and all violations can be brought to book and both civil and criminal prosecution would be initiated. However, the powers of the RoC is subject to the overall Supervision of the ministry.  There are over 10 Lakh companies registered in India and there are over 25 Field offices spread across the country, located in the capital cities of most states.

Official Liquidator (OL)
The Official Liquidators are officers appointed by the Central Government and are attached to various High Courts. The Official Liquidators are under the administrative charge of the respective Regional Directors, who supervise their functioning on behalf of the Ministry. The Official Liquidator is responsible for winding up of the companies that are ordered to be wound up by the Hon'ble High Court under several grounds, the most common being the inability to pay its debts. The winding up process includes taking possession of the assets of a company ordered to be wound up, bringing the assets of the company to sale via public auction, recovery of debts due to the company, invitation of claims against the company from the creditors, settlement of claims so received, distribution of funds to the creditors and contributories, prosecution of directors of the company in the event of misfeasance and eventual dissolution of the company. Each High court has a liquidator attached to it. It may be noted that, with the implementation of Companies Act 2013, the Official Liquidators would be attached to National Company Law Tribunals, that are to be formed.

Regional Directors (RD)
The Regional Director (RD) is the head of Regional Directorates and is usually the senior most ICLS Officer in that region. There are seven Regional Directorates spread across the country, each having jurisdiction over several states and Union Territories. The Regional Director supervises the functioning of Registrar of Companies and Official Liquidators that fall within their jurisdiction. 
It may be pointed out that most of the offences made under Companies Act, 2013 are compoundable offences that does not warrant imprisonment. Compoundable offenses are those wherein specified fines are levied against the company under question. Presently, there are well defined rules that specify what offenses can be compounded by the RoC, RD and the Ministry HQ. Further RD also has the appellate power over the orders of Registrar of Companies.  The Regional Director can either direct Registrar of Companies to carry out an inspection/investigation against a company under its jurisdiction or RD can himself carry out inspection/investigation depending upon the gravity of the situation.

References

External links
IICA.in
Mca.gov.in
Companies Act 2013

Civil Services of India
Ministry of Corporate Affairs
Indian company law